Livio Minelli (February 11, 1926 – February 4, 2012) was an Italian professional boxer. Turning professional in 1943, he fought a total of 86 fights and was the European Boxing Union welterweight champion in 1949. He also fought five world champions in the United States. In later years he became a chef and restaurant owner in New York City. He died on February 4, 2012, at a nursing home in Goshen.

References

1926 births
2012 deaths
Welterweight boxers
Sportspeople from Bergamo
People from Goshen, New York
Italian emigrants to the United States
Italian male boxers